The Yugoslavian 60mm M57 Mortar was generally based on the design of the US 60mm M2 Mortar. Currently, the M57 Mortar is produced by the Serbian company PPT Namenska, and is still used by the 72nd Brigade for Special Operations of the Serbian Armed Forces.

Purpose 
The M57 60mm mortar is intended to provide fire support on short ranges. It is capable of eliminating live forces, firing posts and machine gun nests.

Ammunition 
HE Mortar Shell
60 mm HE Mortar Shell M73 P4
60 mm HE Mortar Shell M73 P3
Smoke Mortar Shell
60 mm Smoke Mortar Shell M73P2
60 mm High-Smoke Mortar Shell M93
Illuminating Mortar Shell
60 mm Illuminating Mortar Shell M67P2

Operators

: one shown in a video in use by Ukrainian fighters.

References

See also 
 M2 mortar
 M224 mortar

Infantry mortars
Artillery of Serbia
60mm mortars
Mortars of Yugoslavia